The National Council of the Magistracy is the Dominican constitutional body responsible for appointing judges of the Supreme Court, the Constitutional Court and the Superior Electoral Court of the Dominican Republic.

The NCM is also the organ called to conduct performance evaluations of judges of the Supreme Court.

History 
The NCM appears in Dominican Republic for the constitutional amendment of 1994, whose existence is recognized promotion and the late José Francisco Peña Gómez, top leader of the Dominican Revolutionary Party (PRD) as a result of the political crisis of the time.

His skills and integration were altered in the new Dominican constitution of 2010.

Composition 
The National Council of the Magistracy is chaired by the President of the Republic.

The rest of its composition is as follows:
 The President of the Senate of the Republic,
 One senator chosen by the Senate belonging to a different party or bloc of parties to the President of the Senate and holding the majority representation of the second;
 The President of the Chamber of Deputies.
 1 of deputy chosen by the Chamber of Deputies belonging to a different party or bloc of parties to the Speaker of the House of Representatives and holding the majority representation of the second;
 The President of the Supreme Court,
 1 judge of the Supreme Court, and
 The Attorney General of the Republic.

Functions 
With its current characteristics, the Council has assigned the functions belonging to the judiciary system, and the remaining quarter of the chosen legal professionals, academics or members of the Public Ministry.

The National Council of the Magistracy, and designating the judges of the Supreme Court, shall determine which of them will take the chair and appoint a first and second substitute to replace the President in case of absence or disability. The President and his deputies shall exercise these functions for a period of seven years, after which, and after performance evaluation conducted by the National Council of the Magistracy, may be elected for a new period.

In case of vacancy of a judge invested with one of the above stated qualities, the National Council of the Magistracy shall appoint a new judge with equal quality or attribute it to any of the judges of the Supreme Court.

Judges of the Supreme Court assessment 
The judges of the Supreme Court shall be subject to performance evaluation at the end of seven years after his election, by the National Council of the Magistracy. In cases where the NCM decides the relevance of removing a judge from office, it should support their decision on the grounds contained in the law governing the matter.

Integration

1997 call

2001 Call

2011 Call

2016 Call

References 

Government of the Dominican Republic